Washington Spirit is an American soccer club founded in 2012, after the team ownership was awarded a National Women's Soccer League (NWSL) franchise. Washington Spirit began playing competitive soccer in the 2013 season. The team has played its home games at Maryland SoccerPlex in Boyds, Maryland, and Audi Field in Washington, D.C.

Statistics
All rostered players during NWSL season are included even if they did not make an appearance. Amateur call-ups are only included if they made an appearance. All statistics have been referenced from Soccerway.com and listings from NWSLsoccer.com.

League statistics

Field players
All statistics include only NWSL regular season matches, and are correct .

Goalkeepers
All statistics include only NWSL regular season matches, and are correct .

NWSL playoffs

Field players
All statistics include only NWSL playoff matches, and are correct .

Goalkeepers
All statistics include only NWSL playoff matches, and are correct .

Cup statistics

Field players
All statistics include only NWSL Challenge Cup and NWSL Fall Series matches, and are correct .

Goalkeepers
All statistics include only NWSL Challenge Cup and NWSL Fall Series matches, and are correct .

References
 Soccerway statistics
 NWSL statistics
 FBref statistics

Lists of soccer players by club in the United States
 
Lists of women's association football players
Lists of American sportswomen
Association football player non-biographical articles
Washington Spirit players
National Women's Soccer League lists